Stump Juice is an album by American jazz organist Jimmy McGriff recorded in 1975 and released on the Groove Merchant label.

Reception 

Allmusic's Jason Ankeny said: "'Unlike the majority of Groove Merchant dates from the mid-'70s, Stump Juice forgoes warhorse pop and soul covers in favor of original tunes – these tabulas rasa are the ideal canvas for Lester's bare-essentials production and McGriff's sinuous grooves, eschewing fusion and disco influences in favor of raw, unadulterated jazz-funk".

Track listing
All compositions by Jimmy McGriff except where noted
 "Purple Onion" (Leo Johnson) – 5:46
 "The Little One" (Johnson) – 4:04
 "Stump Juice" (Jesse Morrison) – 3:37
 "Cumayon" (Johnson) – 3:30
 "T.N.T." – 5:51
 "Stretch Me Out" – 6:28	
 "Pisces" (Jimmy Ponder) – 5:38

Personnel
Jimmy McGriff – organ, keyboards
Ernest Jones – synthesizer
Leo Johnson, Jesse Morrison, Joe Thomas – tenor saxophone
Jimmy Ponder – lead guitar
Ralph Byrd – rhythm guitar
Bob Cranshaw, Andrew McCloud – bass
Lawrence Killian – percussion
Unidentified musicians – trumpet, flute, drums

References

Groove Merchant albums
Jimmy McGriff albums
1975 albums
Albums produced by Sonny Lester